Miss America 1975, the 48th Miss America pageant, was held at the Boardwalk Hall in Atlantic City, New Jersey on September 7, 1974, and broadcast on NBC.

The winner, Shirley Cothran, was a graduate of Denton High School in Texas, the same school attended by the Miss America of four years before, Phyllis George.

Among the other contestants in the 1975 pageant was Miss Florida, actress Delta Burke.

Results

Placements

Order of announcements

Top 10

Awards

Preliminary awards

Other awards

Judges 
 Eileen Farrell
 Dr. Wellington B. Gray
 Trudy Haynes
 Peter Lind Hayes
 Mary Healy
 Eddie Foy III
 Colonel Gilbert Mitchell
 Jeanne Meixell

Contestants

References

External links
 Miss America official website

1975
1974 in the United States
1975 beauty pageants
1974 in New Jersey
September 1974 events in the United States
Events in Atlantic City, New Jersey